The first football match in Sweden was played at Heden, Gothenburg 22 May 1892 between Örgryte IS and Idrottssällskapet Lyckans Soldater. Örgryte IS won the game. The final score was 1-0.

To commemorate this event there is a stone at Heden with the inscription:

In memory of the first football game in Sweden
Örgryte IS-Lyckans soldater
22 May 1892

References

Football in Sweden
Football in Gothenburg
Örgryte IS matches
Sports competitions in Gothenburg
19th century in Gothenburg